Woods v N J Ellingham & Co Ltd [1977] 1 NZLR 218 is a cited case in New Zealand  regarding implied terms in a contract.

Background
Ellingham was a drainlayer contractor contracted to construct a water treatment plant on the Waikato River, and used Woods as a subcontractor. Woods later experienced abnormal terrain at the site, and later abandoned the job before it had completed the contract.

Woods sued for breach of contract, and NJE defended the matter on the basis that they had experienced abnormal terrain on the job, and so were entitled under implied custom in drainlaying contracts to be paid extra for such work.

Held
The court ruled that Woods had not proved that there was such an implied custom existed, and were accordingly ordered to pay damages.

References

Court of Appeal of New Zealand cases
New Zealand contract case law
1977 in New Zealand law
1977 in case law